Scaeosopha pseusta is a species of moth of the family Cosmopterigidae. It is found in the Philippines.

References

Moths described in 1968
Scaeosophinae